The Frank M. Gibson Trophy is a Canadian Football League trophy, given to the most outstanding rookie in the East Division.  Each team from the East Division nominates a candidate from which a winner is chosen, and either this winner or the winner of the Jackie Parker Trophy will receive the Canadian Football League Most Outstanding Rookie Award.

Prior to 1973, the Gruen Trophy was originally awarded to the East's Most Outstanding Canadian Rookie before being retired.

In 1995, as part of the failed American expansion, the Gibson Trophy was given to the most outstanding rookie in the South Division.

Frank M. Gibson Trophy winners

 2022 – Tyson Philpot (WR), Montreal Alouettes
 2021 – Peter Nicastro (OG), Toronto Argonauts
 2020 – season cancelled - covid 19
2019 –  Jake Wieneke (WR), Montreal Alouettes
 2018 - Lewis Ward (K), Ottawa Redblacks
 2017 - James Wilder Jr. (RB), Toronto Argonauts
 2016 - Jason Lauzon-Séguin (OT), Ottawa Redblacks
 2015 - Vidal Hazelton (WR), Toronto Argonauts
 2014 - Tristan Okpalaugo (DL), Toronto Argonauts
 2013 - C. J. Gable (RB), Hamilton Tiger-Cats
 2012 - Chris Matthews (WR), Winnipeg Blue Bombers
 2011 - Chris Williams (WR), Hamilton Tiger-Cats
 2010 - Marcus Thigpen (RB), Hamilton Tiger-Cats
 2009 - Jonathan Hefney (LB), Winnipeg Blue Bombers
 2008 - Prechae Rodriguez (WR), Hamilton Tiger-Cats
 2007 - Nick Setta (P/K), Hamilton Tiger-Cats
 2006 - Etienne Boulay (LB), Montreal Alouettes
 2005 - Matthieu Proulx (DS), Montreal Alouettes
 2004 - Almondo Curry (CB), Montreal Alouettes
 2003 - Julian Radlein (FB), Hamilton Tiger-Cats
 2002 - Keith Stokes (WR), Montreal Alouettes
 2001 - Charles Roberts (RB), Winnipeg Blue Bombers
 2000 - Albert Johnson III (WR), Winnipeg Blue Bombers
 1999 - Corey Grant (WR), Hamilton Tiger-Cats
 1998 - Barron Miles (DB), Montreal Alouettes
 1997 - Derrell Mitchell (SB), Toronto Argonauts
 1996 - Joseph Rogers (WR), Ottawa Rough Riders
 1995 - Chris Wright (WR), Baltimore Stallions
 1994 - Matt Goodwin (DB), Baltimore Football Club
 1993 - Mike O'Shea (DT), Hamilton Tiger-Cats
 1992 - Michael Richardson (RB), Winnipeg Blue Bombers
 1991 - Raghib "Rocket" Ismail (WR), Toronto Argonauts
 1990 - Reggie Barnes (RB), Ottawa Rough Riders
 1989 - Stephen Jordan (DB), Hamilton Tiger-Cats
 1988 - Orville Lee (RB), Ottawa Rough Riders
 1987 - Gil Fenerty (RB), Toronto Argonauts
 1986 - Willie Pless (LB), Toronto Argonauts
 1985 - Nick Benjamin (OL), Ottawa Rough Riders
 1984 - Dwaine Wilson (RB), Montreal Concordes
 1983 - Johnny Shepherd (RB), Hamilton Tiger-Cats
 1982 - Chris Isaac (QB), Ottawa Rough Riders
 1981 - Cedric Minter (RB), Toronto Argonauts
 1980 - Dave Newman (SB), Toronto Argonauts
 1979 - Martin Cox (WR), Ottawa Rough Riders
 1978 - Ben Zambiasi (LB), Hamilton Tiger-Cats
 1977 - Mike Murphy (RB), Ottawa Rough Riders
 1976 - Neil Lumsden (RB), Toronto Argonauts
 1975 - Tom Clements (QB), Ottawa Rough Riders

Outstanding Rookie in the East Division prior to the trophy

 1974 - Sam Cvijanovich (LB), Toronto Argonauts
 1973 - Johnny Rodgers (WR), Montreal Alouettes
 1972 - Chuck Ealey (QB), Hamilton Tiger-Cats

See Gruen Trophy to view other recipients of an award given to the most outstanding rookie in the East Division.
References
CFL Publications: 2011 Facts, Figures & Records''

Canadian Football League trophies and awards